Pierre Curzi (born February 11, 1946 in Montreal, Quebec) is an actor, screenwriter and politician in Quebec. He is a former Member of the National Assembly of Quebec (MNA) for the riding of Borduas in the Montérégie region south of Montreal. Elected under the Parti Québécois (PQ) banner, he later sat as an independent.

Politics

Curzi entered politics when he announced his candidacy for the riding of Borduas in the 2007 provincial elections, following the retirement of Jean-Pierre Charbonneau. He defeated the Action démocratique du Québec's Claude Gauthier by over 2,000 votes. He was later named the PQ critic for culture, communications and language.

Curzi was forced to apologize and retract a statement he made in October 2007 during a radio interview that appeared to suggest that a sovereign Quebec would have "more teeth" and could potentially remove the voting rights of Quebec's English-speaking community living on Montreal's West Island. He faced some criticism in 2008 as one of two MNAs, along with Daniel Turp, who endorsed a controversial petition opposing Paul McCartney's performance at Quebec City's 400th anniversary celebrations. In September 2010, Curzi expressed on the television interview show Les Francs-tireurs his theory that there was a shortage of Francophone players on the National Hockey League team the Montreal Canadiens and that this was "damned well political" and the result of a federalist plot.

On June 6, 2011, Curzi and caucus mates Louise Beaudoin and Lisette Lapointe resigned from the Parti Québécois to sit as independents over the PQ's acceptance of a bill changing the law to permit an agreement between the City of Québec and Quebecor Inc. concerning the construction of an arena in Quebec City.

Acting and screenplay career 
Curzi went to the École nationale de Théâtre in 1969.  Prior to his political career, he played in numerous popular Quebec movies, plays, television shows and documentaries including We Are Far from the Sun (On est loin du soleil), Duplessis, Maria Chapdelaine, The Crime of Ovide Plouffe (Le Crime d'Ovide Plouffe), Babylone, Les Filles de Caleb, Million Dollar Babies, Virginie, Suzanne, Caffè Italia, Montréal, Exit, Matroni and Me (Matroni et moi), The Barbarian Invasions, Tideline (Littoral), Chili's Blues (C'était le 12 du 12, et Chili avait les blues), Le Négociateur, The New Life of Paul Sneijder (La nouvelle vie de Paul Sneijder) and Romeo and Juliet.

Overall, he played roles in about 50 productions since 1971 and had been nominated for four Genie Awards for his roles in Maria Chapdelaine (1983), Lucien Brouillard (1983) and The Decline of the American Empire (Le Déclin de l'empire américain) (1986) and a nomination for best screenplay for Intimate Power (Pouvoir intime) in 1986.

He was also the president of the Union des artistes for eight years. The UDA is the main union group for cinema, theatre and television actors in Quebec.

He is married to Marie Tifo, an actress with whom he costarred in the films Lucien Brouillard, Le jour S... and Intimate Power

Electoral record

Filmography 

 1964 : Trouble-Maker (Trouble fête)
 1971 : We Are Far from the Sun (On est loin du soleil) : Yvon
 1973 : You Are Warm, You Are Warm (Tu brûles... tu brûles...)
 1973 : The Paths of the World (Les Allées de la terre) : Antoine
 1975 : Confidences of the Night (L'Amour blessé)
 1976 : Let's Talk About Love (Parlez-nous d'amour)
 1980 : Fantastica : André
 1980 : Suzanne : Pierre
 1981 : The Plouffe Family (Les Plouffe) : Napoléon Plouffe
 1982 : Wild Flowers (Les Fleurs sauvages) : Pierre Dubuc
 1982 : Red Eyes (Les Yeux rouges) : Bertrand Houle
 1983 : Lucien Brouillard : Lucien Brouillard
 1983 : Maria Chapdelaine : Eutrope Gagnon
 1984 : Le jour S... : Jean-Baptiste Beauregard
 1984 : The Crime of Ovide Plouffe (Le Crime d'Ovide Plouffe) : Napoléon Plouffe
 1985 : Le Million tout-puissant
 1986 : Evixion
 1986 : Intimate Power (Pouvoir intime) : Gildor
 1986 : The Decline of the American Empire (Le Déclin de l'empire américain) : Pierre
 1989 : In the Belly of the Dragon (Dans le ventre du dragon)
 1990 : You're Beautiful, Jeanne (T'es belle Jeanne) : Paul
 1990 : Babylone : Luigi
 1993 : April One : Jean Leduc
 1994 : Chili's Blues (C'était le 12 du 12 et Chili avait les blues) : Monsieur CN
 1996 : A Cry in the Night (Le Cri de la nuit) : Pierre
 1999 : Matroni and Me (Matroni et moi) : M. Larochelle
 2003 : The Barbarian Invasions (Les Invasions barbares) : Pierre
 2003 : 1604 : De Monts
 2004 : La Pension des étranges
 2004 : How to Conquer America in One Night (Comment conquérir l'Amérique en une nuit)
 2004 : Littoral : Policier Turcot
 2005 : Idole instantanée : Gaétan Lemieux
 2006 : Roméo et Juliette : Paul Véronneau
 2007 : Days of Darkness (L'Âge des ténèbres) : Pierre
 2013 : Manigances : Notice Rouge : Georges Paoli
 2016 : The New Life of Paul Sneijder (La Nouvelle Vie de Paul Sneijder) : Maître Wagner-Leblond
 2015 : Chorus : Jérôme
 2018 : The Fall of the American Empire (La Chute de l'empire américain) : Maître Wilbrod Taschereau
 2020 : Old Buddies (Les Vieux chums)
 2021 : A Revision (Une révision)
 2021 : Joutel

Television 

 1975 : Youhou : Michel
 1978 : Duplessis : Reporter
 1979 : Riel : Isidore
 1980 : Frédéric : Biker Leader
 1984 : Le Parc des braves : Major Paul Bérubé
 1985 : Un amour de quartier : Speedy Joe
 1986 : Des dames de cœur : François O'Neil
 1989 : Miléna Nova Tremblay : François Tremblay
 1989 : Super sans plomb : J.-P. St-Onge
 1989 : Un signe de feu : François O'Neil
 1990 : Les Filles de Caleb : Dosithée Pronovost
 1992 : Les Intrépides
 1992 : Montréal P.Q. : Paulus Quintal
 1992 : Les Cravates léopards : Vermontier
 1993 : Shehaweh : Sieur de Maisonneuve
 1993 : Les Grands Procès : Me Robert Calder
 1994 : Cœur à prendre : Vincent, Bouquet
 1994 : Les Jumelles Dionne (tv movie) : Alphonse Fortier
 1995 : Jalna : Greg
 1996 : Marguerite Volant : Renaud Larochelle
 1997 : Le Masque : Victor Thibault
 1996 : Virginie : Gilles Bazinet (1997-2002)
 2004 : Smash : Bernier Fafard
 2005 : Providence : Jean-Guy Bélanger
 2005 : Le Négociateur : Maurice Martel
 2007 : Les Invincibles : Gene
 2010 : La Promesse : Daniel (Nurse)
 2014 : Nouvelle Adresse : Gérard Lapointe
 2014 : Mensonges : Dr Michel Pelletier (Psychiatrist)
 2015 : O''' : Richard
 2018 : Appelle-moi si tu meurs : Cesare Ciccarelli

 Theatre 
 2006: août (Jean Marc Dalpé)
 2005: La Tempête (William Shakespeare)
 2005: Coin St-Laurent 2002: La Nuit des rois (William Shakespeare)
 2001: L'Hiver de force (Réjean Ducharme)
 2001: Le Mouton et la Baleine (Ahmed Ghazali)
 1999: Trick or treat (Jean Marc Dalpé)
 1998: Le miroir aux tartuffes (Jean-Claude Germain)
 1997: Chrysanthème (Eugène Lion)
 1995: Mère Courage (Bertolt Brecht)
 1994: La Mouette (Anton Tchekhov)
 1993: La Reprise (Claude Gauvreau)
 1992: Six personnages en quête d'auteur (Luigi Pirandello)
 1992: Conte d'Hiver (Anne Legault)
 1991: Shakespeare, un monde qu'on peut apprendre par cœur (Michel Garneau)
 1989: La Nuit du 16 janvier (Ayn Rand)
 1988: Le Baiser de la Femme Araignée (Manuel Puig)
 1988: Cendres (David Rudkin)
 1986: Deux sur la Balançoire (W. Gibson)
 1986: Avec Lorenzo à mes Côtés (Grand Cirque ordinaire inspired from Musset)
 1984: En attendant Godot (Samuel Beckett)
 1984: Mère Courage (Bertolt Brecht)
 1984: Le Tir à Blanc (André Ricard)
 1979: Le Théâtre de la Maintenance (Jean Barbeau)
 1978: L'Abécédaire Conditionnel (Michel Garneau)
 1978: Les Fiancés de Rose Latulipe (Grand Cirque ordinaire)
 1977: Les Nerfs à l'Air (Collective)
 1977: L'Impromptu chez M. R. Pantalon 1976: La Steppette Impossible 1975: La Tragédie Américaine de l'Enfant Prodigue (Collective)
 1975: Colette et Pérusse (Robert Claing)
 1975: Une Brosse (Jean Barbeau)
 1974: Floralie (Roch Carrier)
 1974: Salut Galarneau (Jacques Godbout and D. Chouinard)
 1973: Don Quichotte (Jean-Pierre Ronfard, adapted from Cervantes)
 1973: Galipotte 8 (Robert Gravel)
 1972: Les Oranges sont vertes (Claude Gauvreau)
 1972: Sparages (Marcel Sabourin)
 1971: Les Fourberies de Scapin (Molière)
 1971: Chiniqui (Collective)
 1970: Chmou (Pierre Bégin and  Pierre Collin)
 1970: La Guerre Yes Sir (Roch Carrier)
 1969: Gens de Noël, Tremblez!, (Collective)
 1969: À Cœur Ouvert (Robert Gurick)
 1969: P.O.T. T.V.'', (Collective)

Note 
The Sections Filmography, Television and Theatre were copied and adapted from the French Wikipedia Page of Pierre Curzi. See that page's history for attribution.

References

External links
 
 Curzi's Bio
 

1946 births
Living people
Canadian actor-politicians
Canadian male film actors
Canadian male stage actors
Canadian male television actors
Canadian male screenwriters
Canadian screenwriters in French
French Quebecers
Independent MNAs in Quebec
Male actors from Montreal
Parti Québécois MNAs
Politicians from Montreal
Writers from Montreal
Canadian people of Italian descent
21st-century Canadian politicians